Charles Deulin (1827–1877) was a French writer, theatre critic, and folklorist who is most known for his contemporary adaptations of European folk tales. Among his many stories are "Cambrinus, King of Beer", "The Twelve Dancing Princesses", "The Enchanted Canary", and "The Nettle Spinner'.

Deulin was born into a poor family in Condé-sur-l'Escaut. a former department of France a commune on the Belgian border of northern France. His father was a tailor, but Deulin found work as secretary to a notary—who also happened to be a patron of the arts. After Deulin eloped with a local girl and moved to Paris, he made a living writing columns and theatre reviews for various periodicals; but his most successful works were short stories based on the folk tales of the countryside. He reinvigorated the tales by infusing them with the character of the time and place in which he lived. The vernacular language and familiar ambiance appealed to his readers in the Low Countries.

His first effort, "Le compère de la mort", was an adaptation of an oral story he had once heard. He went on to research and write three short story collections, which were well-received and widely read: Tales of a Beer Drinker (1868), Tales of King Cambrinus (1874), and Small Town Stories: Tales and Novellas (1875). After Deulin's death in 1877, his publisher distributed the author's final contribution to folkloristics: Mother Goose Tales before Perrault (1878). (Charles Perrault (1628–1703) is the author of Tales of Mother Goose (1697) and the founder of the fairy tale genre.)

See also
 19th-century French literature
 French folklore
 Charles Perrault

References

Bibliography

External links

 
 
 Contes du roi Cambrinus at Gallica, Bibliothèque nationale de France

19th-century French writers
French male short story writers
French short story writers
French folklorists
Collectors of fairy tales
Fairy tale scholars
Folklore writers
1827 births
1877 deaths
19th-century French male writers
French male non-fiction writers